Proximity chat or spatial chat or positional chat is type of internet platform that overlays video teleconferencing software on a virtual world environment, so that users can navigate freely and have conversations among small groups.

A distribution of small groups across a virtual world map can be more informal than a many-to-many session, and to some extent this format is a functional replacement for breakout rooms. Some of the platforms employ a retrogaming aesthetic similar to a 2D overworld, while others work from a blank virtual world or one built up of a collage of photos placed by the user.

Proximity chat has been featured in many multiplayer video games. One popular software for implementing this functionality in games without built-in proximity chat is Mumble.

In 2021 the children's game platform Roblox introduced a proximity chat feature for verified users over the age of 13. This feature prompted complaints by privacy advocates, since verification involves submitting a selfie and government issued ID to the company, which has a prior history of data leaks. Users have also expressed skepticism that the verification system has properly excluded younger users. Users and the parents of users have also complained, as inappropriate content such as slurs, sexual content, and illegal conduct such as drug deals have been documented as being audible on the platform.

See also 
 Chat room
 Metaverse

References 

Virtual events
Virtual world communities
Web conferencing
Video games
Video game terminology